is a puzzle video game released in 1998 on the Nintendo 64 in Japan only. The game was developed and published by Konami. It is a port of the arcade and PlayStation game , originally released in 1996, but also features characters and gameplay from the spin-off .

Gameplay

The gameplay is similar to Puyo Puyo. The player must beat the opponent by creating combos, which involve matching three balls or more of the same color simultaneously. Doing so will fill the opponent's side with colored blocks from either the top or bottom. The blocks contain a certain ball color, depending on the color of the block. When blocks are matched, the color ball is released. The side that exceeds the top first loses. Score is also added for both sides, but the opponent's score doesn't affect the rounds in any way.

Characters
Eight characters return from Susume! Taisen Puzzle-Dama and four from Taisen Tokkae-Dama, with one being new to the series.
 (voiced by Hekiru Shiina)
 (voiced by Ai Orikasa)
 (voiced by Chisa Yokoyama)
 (voiced by Takehito Koyasu)
 (voiced by Yuri Amano)
 (voiced by Toshiyuki Morikawa)
 (voiced by Megumi Hayashibara)
 (voiced by Yayoi Jinguji)
 (voiced by Kenyu Horiuchi)
 (voiced by Wataru Takagi) - Doubles as the first boss character, as the first boss from Susume! (Mr. Chin) does not appear.
 (voiced by Kan Tokumaru) - Second boss character. CPU-controlled character only, but playable in Battle Mode with hidden codes.
 (voiced by Katsuya Shiga) - Final boss character. Since the true final boss from Susume!, Yukio Hattari, does not appear in the game, Okugata-sama is faced as the final boss whether continues are used or not. CPU-controlled character only, but playable in Battle Mode with hidden codes.
 (voiced by Hekiru Shiina) - An "evil" palette swap of Mako-Rin. Appears as a secret character in 2-player Battle Mode only. Uses the attack patterns of other characters at random.

References

1998 video games
Arcade video games
Nintendo 64 games
Konami games
Japan-exclusive video games
Puzzle video games
Video games featuring female protagonists
Video games developed in Japan